XHSIAC-FM is a community radio station on 97.5 FM owned by the indigenous community of Xalitla, Guerrero, a town in the municipality of Tepecoacuilco de Trujano.

History

Broadcasts began in 2015 as a pirate station. The Indigenous Community of Xalitla, Guerrero filed for an indigenous station on May 12, 2017. The station award was approved on December 12, 2018. Upon receiving the concession on February 26, 2019, the newly-named XHSIAC moved from its pirate frequency of 91.3 MHz to 97.5.

References

Radio stations in Guerrero
Indigenous radio stations in Mexico
Former pirate radio stations
Radio stations established in 2015